Apollo 18: The Moon Missions is a simulation video game developed by American studio AIM Software and published by Project Two Interactive on March 31, 1999, for Windows.

The game tales place on two disks: a video-heavy tutorial disk, and the simulation training at Johnson Space Center. Players learn proper commands and sequence, and then apply this to the Apollo 18 to ensure a successful launch.

While the Apollo 18 is fictitious, the game is based on the real events that led to the 1969 moon landing.

IGN felt that the game ultimately left feelings of boredom and frustration. Gamesmania gave the title a rating of 20% while PC Joker gave it 19%. GamePro criticised the Spartan 200 page manual.

References

External links
Deck Mafia Games

1999 video games
Space flight simulator games
Video games developed in the United States
Windows games
Windows-only games